Fictibacillus rigui is a Gram-positive, aerobic, spore-forming and motile bacterium from the genus of Fictibacillus which has been isolated from fresh water from the Woopo wetland in Korea.

References

External links 

Type strain of Fictibacillus rigui at BacDive -  the Bacterial Diversity Metadatabase

Bacillaceae
Bacteria described in 2010